A Coast Guard Air Station (abbreviated as CGAS or AirSta) provides aviation support for the United States Coast Guard. The Coast Guard operates approximately 210 aircraft from 24 Coast Guard Air Stations in the United States. Fixed-wing aircraft, such as the HC-130 Hercules, are built for long range missions and operate from air stations. The MH-65D Dolphin and Sikorsky HH-60 Jayhawk helicopters also operate from Air Stations, Air Facilities and flight deck equipped cutters.

First District

Fifth District

Seventh District

Eighth District

Ninth District

Eleventh District

Thirteenth District

Fourteenth District

Seventeenth District

Others
Air Detachment Naples (Naples, Campania, Italy) (disestablished 1972)
Air Detachment Argentia (Argentia, Newfoundland, Canada) (disestablished 1966)

Images

See also
List of United States military bases

References
42. https://cgaviationhistory.org/1969-coast-guard-air-station-chicago-established/

External links

Coast Guard Air Stations
"Coast Guard Grows Wings to Save Lives" Popular Mechanics, April 1936 list of USCG air stations in 1936

 
Air Stations
Coast Guards Air Stations
Air